Vespetrò is a Lombard liqueur from Canzo. Its main ingredients are spices and medicinal plants. It is marketed with the brand Vespetrò Scannagatta and produced – as a homemade product – also by some families in Canzo, who hand down the recipe from generation to generation.

History

The recipe of Vespetrò, of Savoyard origin, has been present in Canzo at least since 18th century and was appreciated by tourists as a speciality of the town.

During the 19th century, a Canzese pharmacist, Scannagatta, perfected the traditional recipe of the town, patented it and began to market it. The brand Vespetrò Scannagatta was awarded during the 1900 Paris World's fair and was appreciated by the 20th century's tourists, coming in Canzo and surroundings, in its yellow and elongated bottle.

After a stop in the years 1992–2007, the selling restarted. Scannagatta exact recipe remains secret, and also every producing family of Canzo treasures its own version, with slight variations in the method of producing and in the proportion of ingredients.

Taste and alcohol content

The taste is sweet and anise-like. The grade is about 40% abv.

See also

 Lombard cuisine
 Canzo – Cuisine
 Canzo – Culture

Bibliography

 Karl Baedeker, L’Italie: Manuel du voyageur. Première partie: l’Italie septentrionale, 1865

Italian liqueurs
Cuisine of Lombardy